Events from the year 2013 in Taiwan, Republic of China. This year is numbered Minguo 102 according to the official Republic of China calendar.

Incumbents
 President – Ma Ying-jeou
 Vice President – Wu Den-yih
 Premier – Jiang Yi-huah
 Vice Premier – Mao Chi-kuo

Events

January
 1 January
 The establishment of Customs Administration of the Ministry of Finance.
 The establishment of K-12 Education Administration of the Ministry of Education.
 The renaming of Sports Affairs Council to Sports Administration of the Ministry of Education.
 The renaming of Department of Education to K-12 Education Administration of the Ministry of Education.
 The renaming of National Youth Commission to Youth Development Administration and being put under the Ministry of Education.

February
 21 February – The opening of Hsinchu Taiwan Pavilion Expo Park in East District, Hsinchu City.

March
 14 March – The opening of Embassy of Tuvalu in Taipei.
 27 March - The 5.9  Nantou earthquake affected the island with a maximum Mercalli intensity of V (Moderate). One person was killed and 97 were injured.

May
 1 May – The opening of Chelungpu Fault Preservation Park in Zhushan Township, Nantou County.
 3 May – The upgrade approval for Taoyuan County to become special municipality from county.
 9 May – The first meeting of the China Affairs Committee of Democratic Progressive Party.
 31 May – The opening of Embassy of Kiribati in Taipei.

June
 2 June - June 2013 Nantou earthquake.
 9 June – The official opening of At-Taqwa Mosque in Taoyuan County.
 13 June – The completion of Xinzhuang Joint Office Tower in Xinzhuang District, New Taipei.
 29 June – The opening of Danfeng Station of Taipei Metro in Xinzhuang District and Taishan District, New Taipei.

July
 4 July – Death of Hung Chung-chiu.
 7–14 July – Typhoon Soulik.
 20 July – 2013 Kuomintang chairmanship election.
 23 July – The establishment of the Ministry of Health and Welfare from the former Department of Health.
 29 July – The opening of Kaisyuan Night Market in Cianjhen District, Kaohsiung City.

August
 The establishment of University of Taipei from the merger of Taipei Municipal University of Education and Taipei Physical Education College.

September
16–22 September – 2013 OEC Kaohsiung

October
 2013 Taiwan food scandal.
 5 October – The opening of Guchuan Bridge in Pingtung County.
 10 October – The 102nd anniversary of the National Day of the Republic of China.
 24 October – The official opening of Asia Museum of Modern Art in Wufeng District, Taichung.
 27 October – The opening of Shanshuilu Eco Park in Nangang District, Taipei.

November
 3–11 November – Typhoon Haiyan.
 10 November – 19th National Congress of Kuomintang in Taichung.
 14 November – The Gambia cut diplomatic relations with the Republic of China.
 18 November – The ROC officially terminated its diplomatic relations with The Gambia.
 24 November – The opening of Xinyi Line of Taipei Metro.

Deaths
 18 February – Chu Hsing-yu, 56, Taiwanese politician, MLY (1993–2005), heart attack.
 13 April – Lin Yang-kang, 85, Taiwanese politician, President of Judicial Yuan (1987–1994).
29 April – Levi Ying, 64, Taiwanese-American politician, MLY (1999–2002).
6 May – Yang Tzuo-chow, 84, Taiwanese politician, MLY (1999–2002).
 19 June – Kuo Liang-hui, Taiwanese novelist.
13 October – , 91, Taiwanese soldier (Indonesian National Revolution).

References

 
Years of the 21st century in Taiwan